Michael Noer may refer to:

 Michael Noer (director) (born 1978), Danish film director
 Michael Noer (editor) (born 1969), American magazine editor